Giselle Donnelly (born Thomas Donnelly; June 13, 1953) is a research fellow at the American Enterprise Institute for Public Policy Research (AEI). Donnelly is a writer, an analyst of military affairs and defense, national security and foreign policy and the author of AEI's National Security Outlook. She has been a director at the Lockheed Martin Corporation on strategic communications and initiatives since 2002. She was deputy executive director of the Project for the New American Century (PNAC) from 1999 to 2002.

She is now a resident fellow and co-director with Gary Schmitt of the American Enterprise Institute's Marilyn Ware Center for Security Studies launched in 2012.

Career
Donnelly was educated at Sidwell Friends School. She received her M.I.P.P. from the School of Advanced International Studies at Johns Hopkins University and a B.A. from Ithaca College.

She began her career as a journalist at her family's Journal newspapers in the Washington, D.C. area in 1978. Two years later she began working at Army Times.  In 1985, she helped to launch Defense News and became its Deputy Editor (1984–1987). She returned to Army Times and served as editor from 1987 to 1993. During her tenure she redesigned the paper and oversaw writing on Operation Just Cause in Panama, the First Gulf War, and the mission to Somalia. She became executive editor of The National Interest on 1994 and remained for one year.

In 1995 she moved on to become a professional staff member at the U.S. House of Representatives Committee on National Security (now the Committee on Armed Services). She was appointed director of the Policy Group of the Committee, a post which she held from 1996 to 1999. She was the principal author of Rebuilding America's Defenses: Strategy, Forces and Resources for a New Century published by PNAC in September 2000.

Donnelly had begun transitioning before publicly living as a trans woman in October of 2018, taking the name Giselle.

Bibliography

Lessons for a Long War: How America Can Win on New Battlefields (AEI, 2010) Frederick W. Kagan
Ground Truth: The Future of U.S. Land Power (AEI, 2008), coauthored with Frederick W. Kagan
Of Men and Materiel: The Crisis in Military Resources (AEI, 2007), co-edited with Gary J. Schmitt
The Military We Need (AEI, 2005);
Operation Iraqi Freedom: A Strategic Assessment (2004)
Clash of Chariots: A History of Armored Warfare, Berkeley Books, 1996
Operation Just Cause: The Storming of Panama, Lexington Books, 1991

References

External links
 Donnelly's scholar page on the American Enterprise Institute's official website
 NDU bio
 

Living people
American women journalists
American political consultants
Ithaca College alumni
Paul H. Nitze School of Advanced International Studies alumni
1953 births
American LGBT journalists
Transgender women
Transgender writers
Sidwell Friends School alumni